Jack Aitchison (born 5 March 2000) is a Scottish professional footballer who plays as a forward for Motherwell.

Career

Celtic
Aitchison graduated from Celtic's school of excellence at St Ninians High School in Kirkintilloch in February 2016, at which time he joined Celtic full-time and became part of their Under 17 squad. He played in the Celtic U17 side that defeated their Rangers counterparts 4–0 in the Glasgow Cup final in April 2016. At this time, he also signed a three-year contract. During his youth career he also  appeared and scored in the 2015–16 and 2016–17 editions of the UEFA Youth League, found the net against senior clubs in the 2016–17 Scottish Challenge Cup, and won the Scottish Youth Cup in 2017.

Aitchison made his first team debut on 15 May 2016, becoming the youngest player ever to represent the club in a competitive match at 16 years and 71 days. He scored with his first touch in the match, providing Celtic's seventh goal in a 7–0 win over Motherwell, in turn making him the youngest ever player to score a competitive goal for the club. His next appearance for the first team came in January 2017, coming on in the final minutes of a home league match against Hearts and winning a penalty which Scott Sinclair converted for Celtic's last goal in a 4–0 win.

Aitchison joined League One club Dumbarton on loan in August 2018. He was then loaned to Championship club Alloa Athletic in January 2019.

On 2 September 2019, Aitchison moved on a season-long loan deal to English League Two club Forest Green Rovers. He scored on his debut as a substitute in a 1–0 win away to Cambridge United on 7 September 2019.

Barnsley
On 5 October 2020, Aitchison joined Championship side Barnsley on a three-year contract after leaving Celtic.

Forest Green Rovers (loan)
On 2 July 2021, Aitchison returned to former loan club Forest Green Rovers, again on loan for the duration of the 2021–22 season.

Motherwell 
On 31 January 2023, Aitchison joined Scottish Premiership club Motherwell on a permanent deal until the end of the season.

Career statistics

Notes

Honours
Forest Green Rovers
League Two: 2021–22

References

External links

2000 births
Living people
Scottish footballers
Scotland youth international footballers
Celtic F.C. players
Association football forwards
Footballers from West Lothian
Scottish Professional Football League players
Dumbarton F.C. players
Alloa Athletic F.C. players
Forest Green Rovers F.C. players
Barnsley F.C. players
Stevenage F.C. players
English Football League players
People from Fauldhouse
Motherwell F.C. players